London Central Portfolio (LCP) is a UK real estate investment firm, founded in 1990 by Naomi Heaton and operating in the accommodation sector in central London. As of 2017 it had approximately US$1 billion of assets under management.

The company's services comprise real estate investment, property sourcing and acquisition, development, refurbishment and interior design, letting and rental management. LCP also advises listed real estate investment funds, including the UK's first sharia-compliant residential property funds.

History 
London Central Portfolio was founded to offer an integrated residential property acquisition, development and letting service.

LCP launched its first fund—the London Central Portfolio Property Fund—in 2007 and its second fund—the London Central Residential Recovery Fund—in 2010.

LCP has also launched two sharia-compliant residential funds, including the first in the UK.

LCP launched its London Central Apartments III fund in July 2016.

Other activities 
LCP undertakes research and analysis on the UK property market used by BBC Radio 4's Today Programme, BBC News, Sky News, the London Evening Standard, the Guardian; CNBC, Metro, the Daily Telegraph, the Sunday Times and the Financial Times.

References

External links 
Official website – https://www.londoncentralportfolio.com/

Property companies based in London
Property services companies of the United Kingdom
British companies established in 1990